The England national team have competed in every Rugby World Cup since the inaugural tournament in 1987. They have played 51 matches in nine tournaments, and won 36 for a winning record of 70.59%. Their best ever position was champions in 2003, whilst they have also participated in three other finals; the 2019 final, the 2007 final and the final of the 1991 competition. They have beaten two countries four times; Australia and the United States. Their worst record is against South Africa, who have defeated them in four of their five encounters.

England co-hosted the 1991 Rugby World Cup with Ireland, Scotland, Wales and France, with the final between England and Australia played at Twickenham. England was the sole host of the 2015 Rugby World Cup, although eight games were held at the Millennium Stadium, the Welsh national stadium in Cardiff.

By position

By tournament

1987 New Zealand & Australia
Group matches

Quarter final

1991 UK, Ireland & France
Group matches

Quarter final

Semi final

Final

1995 South Africa
Group matches

Quarter final

Semi final

Third-place play-off

1999 Wales
Group matches

Quarter-final play-offs

Quarter final

2003 Australia
Group matches

Quarter final

Semi final

Final

2007 France
Group matches

Quarter final

Semi final

Final

2011 New Zealand
Group matches

Quarter final

2015 England 
Group matches

2019 Japan 
Group matches

Notes:
As a result of inclement weather caused by Typhoon Hagibis this match was cancelled and awarded as a 0–0 draw.

Quarter-final

Semi-final

Final

Overall record

References

 Davies, Gerald (2004) The History of the Rugby World Cup, Sanctuary Publishing Ltd,
 Farr-Jones, Nick, (2003). Story of the Rugby World Cup, Australian Post Corporation,

External links 

 Rugbyworldcup.com Official site of the Rugby World Cup.
 IRB.com Official site of the International Rugby Board.

World Cup
Rugby World Cup by nation